DirectDraw (ddraw.dll) is an API that used to be a part of Microsoft's DirectX API. DirectDraw is used to accelerate rendering of 2D graphics in applications. DirectDraw also allows applications to run fullscreen or embedded in a window such as most other MS Windows applications. DirectDraw uses hardware acceleration if it is available on the client's computer. DirectDraw allows direct access to video memory, hardware overlays, hardware blitters, and page flipping. Its video memory manager can manipulate video memory with ease, taking full advantage of the blitting and color decompression capabilities of different types of display adapters.

DirectDraw is a 2D API. That is, it contains commands for 2D rendering and does not support 3D hardware acceleration. A programmer could use DirectDraw to draw 3D graphics, but the rendering would be slow compared to an API such as Direct3D which does support 3D hardware acceleration.

DirectDraw was introduced for Windows Mobile in Windows Mobile 5.0, replacing the graphics component of GAPI, which was then deprecated.

With the release of DirectX version 8.0, DirectDraw was merged into a new package called DirectX Graphics, which extended Direct3D with a few DirectDraw API additions. DirectDraw can still be used by programmers, but they must use older DirectX interfaces (DirectX 7 and below).

In June 2010, DirectDraw was removed from the DirectX SDK package, but in 2012, the DirectX SDK was merged into the Windows Platform SDK, and DirectDraw was included once again.

Replacement 
There has been a deterioration of Windows compatibility with old games that rely upon DirectDraw, with Command & Conquer, Warcraft 2, and Theme Hospital among those affected. In newer Windows versions, some games will refuse to run under a 32-bit bit depth (Dangerous Waters for example), others showing a black screen or glitching when switched out. Re-implementation of DirectDraw has been observed to fix these compatibility problems. Commonly used replacements include:
 WineD3D from Wine, which translates into OpenGL.
 cnc-ddraw and ts-ddraw from CnCNet, a Command & Conquer multiplayer network. Translates into GDI, OpenGL (with GLSL support), or Direct3D 9.
 DDrawCompat, a wrapper for the vanilla ddraw that corrects problematic calls. ddwrapper is an earlier, unrelated wrapper that does the same thing.

See also
 DirectDraw Surface
 Direct2D
 Direct3D
 DirectX

References

External links 
 Microsoft API Reference for DirectDraw
 Microsoft API Overview for DirectDraw

Draw DirectDraw
Graphics libraries
Microsoft application programming interfaces